Reconstruction is a psychological romantic drama film and the debut of Christoffer Boe, who also wrote the screenplay together with Mogens Rukov. It was filmed in Copenhagen and won the Camera D’Or at the Cannes Film Festival in 2003 Golden Plaque for Manuel Alberto Claro's luminous wide-screen cinematography.

Plot
The central character is Alex (Nikolaj Lie Kaas), a Danish photographer with a Stockholm-bred girlfriend, Simone (Maria Bonnevie).

Late one evening Alex suddenly abandons his girlfriend, Simone, to pursue the beautiful Aimee, played also by Maria Bonnevie. In his encounter with Aimee time and place dissolve for him and he becomes a stranger to Simone, to whom he cannot return.

“It’s all a film. It’s all a construction,” announces the narrator,  who is soon revealed to be a noted Swedish author, August (Krister Henriksson), as well as the tale’s apparent inventor.

Shooting
The film was shot almost entirely in available light.  The crew shot Super 16 on an Arri SR3 using three different stocks. Then the film was scanned, color-graded, and digitally masked to CinemaScope. The scan was a simple one-light, and the team did no color correction, the opposite of today's trend to perform a digital intermediate. They also pushed the emulsion for extra grain.

Cast
Alex David -- Nikolaj Lie Kaas
Simone, Aimee -- Maria Bonnevie
Leo Sand -- Nicolas Bro
Monica -- Ida Dwinger
Nan Sand -- Helle Fagralid
Journalist -- Isabella Miehe-Renard
Fru Banum (Mrs. Banum) -- Malene Schwartz
Mel David -- Peter Steen
Tryllekunstner -- Klaus Mulbjerg
August Holm -- Krister Henriksson
Mercedes Sand -- Mercedes Claro Schelin
Waiter -- Jens Blegaa
Bartender -- Katrin Muth
Bartender -- David Dencik

Soundtrack
 Samuel Barber - "Adagio for Strings"
 Fred Astaire - "Night & Day"
 Charles Paul Wilp - "Madison Avenue Perfume Ad"
 Schubert - Piano Sonata in B flat major, D960 (II. Andante sostenuto)

References

External links

"The Reality of Feelings" by Claus Christensen
"A Man and a Women" by Mark Jenkins

2003 films
2000s Danish-language films
Films directed by Christoffer Boe
Films set in Copenhagen
Films shot in Denmark
Danish drama films
Nordisk Film films
Caméra d'Or winners
2003 drama films